The Malaysia national netball team represents Malaysia in international netball competition at the quadrennial World Netball Championships for the INF Netball World Cup. Malaysia lost the title at the 2005 Asian Netball Championships to Singapore, 53–39. Malaysia qualified for the 2011 World Netball Championships in Singapore, finishing 16th. The team was coached by Choo Kon Lee. As of 2 December 2019, Malaysia is world ranked at 25th. Following the appointment of Australia's Tracey Robinson as head coach in 2016 the team were the 2018 Asian Netball Championships, defeating Sri Lanka. Another title followed at the 2017 Southeast Asian Games captained by Nur Syafazliyana against Singapore. They defended their title at the 2019 Southeast Asian Games, beating Singapore 48-42.

Team

2019 SEA Squad

Asst Coach Aminah Ashaari
Manager Zaiton Abdul Ghani

2011 World Netball Championships
Twelve players were selected for the 2011 World Netball Championships, held from 3–10 July.

Competitive history

See also
 Netball in Malaysia

References

Netball
National netball teams of Asia
Netball in Malaysia